The General Electric F110 is an afterburning turbofan jet engine produced by GE Aviation. The engine is derived from the General Electric F101 and primarily powers tactical fighter aircraft. The F118 is a non-afterburning variant of the F110. The engine is also built by IHI Corporation in Japan, TUSAŞ Engine Industries (TEI) in Turkey, and in several other countries as part of licensing agreements.

Design and development
The F110 emerged from an intersection of efforts in the 1970s by General Electric to reenter the U.S. fighter engine market and the U.S. Air Force's desire to address the reliability, longevity, and maintenance issues with the Pratt & Whitney F100 engines that powered its F-15s and F-16s. In 1975, General Electric used its own funds to begin developing the F101X, a derivative of its F101 engine for the B-1 bomber; the F101X would inherit much of the core design while having a smaller fan that's upscaled from the F404 so that its thermodynamic cycle and thrust were better suited for a fighter engine. The convergent-divergent iris nozzle was also derived from the F404. The cancellation of the B-1A by the Carter Administration (in lieu of the Advanced Technology Bomber which became the B-2) meant a loss of business for General Electric, and provided further impetus to provide the F101X for the fighter engine market. The engine attracted the interest of the Air Force's Engine Model Derivative Program (EMDP), and in 1979 began funding it as the F101 Derivative Fighter Engine, or F101 DFE. The Air Force saw the F101 DFE as a potential alternative to the F100 and also a way to coerce better performance from Pratt & Whitney in addressing issues with the F100.

Following the completion of ground tests in 1980, the F101 DFE was first fitted on an F-16 for flight testing, where it showed considerable improvement in performance and operability over the existing F100. In 1982, the Air Force began the full-scale development of the F101 DFE as an option to compete with the F100 for application in future F-15 and F-16 production; the engine was eventually selected for the F-16 and designated the F110-GE-100. The threat by the F110 has been cited as a reason for Pratt & Whitney to more quickly rectify the issues affecting the F100 and developing the improved F100-PW-220 variant. Seeking to drive unit costs down and improve contractor performance, the Air Force implemented the Alternate Fighter Engine (AFE) competition between the F100 and F110 in 1983 in what was nicknamed "The Great Engine War", where the engine contract would be awarded through competition. The Air Force would buy both engines starting in 1984, with contracts being competed every fiscal year and the percentages of F100 versus F110 would vary based on contract; the competitions eventually ended in 1992.

The F101 DFE was also tested in the F-14B prototype in 1981, and the aircraft saw considerable performance improvement over the existing Pratt & Whitney TF30. Although further testing was halted by the Navy in 1982, it would use the results of the Air Force's AFE evaluation to choose the powerplant for future F-14s. The F101 DFE was eventually chosen by the Navy in 1984 and was designated the F110-GE-400.

Design

The F110-GE-100/400 is a low-bypass axial-flow afterburning turbofan. It has a 3-stage fan driven by a two-stage low-pressure turbine and a 9-stage compressor driven by a one-stage high-pressure turbine; bypass ratio is 0.87. In contrast to the ambitious performance goals for the F100 of high thrust and low weight, the F110 placed a greater emphasis on balancing between reliability, operability, and performance. The fan and inlet guide vanes were designed to smooth airflow to increase resistance to compressor stalls. The engine has an electronic and hydromechanical control system that was forgiving of rapid throttle inputs. The main difference between the -100 and the -400 is the latter's augmentor, or afterburner section, being about 50 inches longer.

Further developments
In the mid-1980s, the Air Force sought greater power for its tactical fighters and began Improved Performance Engine (IPE) programs for the F100 and F110, with the goal of achieving thrust in the  class, while retaining the durability achieved in the F100-PW-220 and F110-GE-100. The result would be the Pratt & Whitney F100-PW-229 and General Electric F110-GE-129. Compared to the -100, the -129 incorporated component improvements, including a full authority digital engine control (FADEC), that allowed maximum thrust to be achieved in a wider range of conditions and across larger portions of the flight envelope, while retaining 80% commonality; bypass ratio was reduced to 0.76.

A non-afterburning variant of the F110, designated the F118, would power the B-2 stealth bomber and the re-engined U-2S reconnaissance aircraft. A variant of the F110-GE-100 fitted with a 3-dimensional axisymmetric thrust vectoring nozzle, referred by General Electric as the Axisymmetric Vectoring Exhaust Nozzle (AVEN), was tested on a specially modified F-16 called the NF-16D VISTA  under the Multi-Axis Thrust-Vectoring (MATV) program.

The F110 would see the development of a further enhanced variant starting in 2000 with the F110-GE-132, initially referred to as the F110-GE-129EFE (Enhanced Fighter Engine). The -132 incorporates an improved fan that is more efficient and can increase maximum airflow, composite fan duct, durability improvements to the hot section, radial augmentor (or afterburner), and control system improvements. The engine leveraged research performed under the Integrated High Performance Turbine Engine Technology (IHPTET) program. The F110-GE-132 was selected to power the F-16E/F Block 60 for the United Arab Emirates. Engine flight tests began in 2003, and first delivery was in 2005. Some of the technology from the -132 is shared with the F110 Service Life Extension Program (SLEP).

Major applications

F-14

The F-14A entered service with the United States Navy in 1973 powered by Pratt & Whitney TF30s. By the end of the decade, following numerous problems with the original engine (and similar problems with the F100 on the F-15 and F-16), the DoD began procuring the upgraded TF30-P-414As. While these engines solved the serviceability problems, the fuel consumption and thrust was comparable to the initial model—considerably less than what the F-14 had been designed for; the F-14's originally planned Pratt & Whitney F401, an upscaled naval development of the F100 design, was also canceled due to costs and reliability issues.

After reviewing the results of the Air Force's AFE evaluation, the Navy would choose the F101 DFE to re-engine the F-14 in 1984, with the variant designated the F110-GE-400; the primary difference between the -400 and the Air Force's F110-GE-100 is length — the -400 had a  tailpipe extension to suit the F-14 airframe, which was fitted downstream of the augmentor (afterburner section). This provided a significant increase over the TF30's maximum uninstalled thrust of 20,900 lbf (93 kN), and was similar to the F-14's originally intended F401. These upgraded jets were initially known as F-14A+ before being re-designated as the F-14B, as were new production aircraft powered by the F110. The same engine also powered the final variant of the aircraft, the F-14D.

Proposed upgraded variants of the F-14, such as the Super Tomcat 21 (ST-21), were to be powered by the F110-GE-429, the naval variant of the F110-GE-129 IPE.

F-16
The F-16 Fighting Falcon entered service powered by the Pratt & Whitney F100 afterburning turbofan. Seeking a way to drive unit costs down, the USAF implemented the Alternate Fighter Engine (AFE) program in 1984, under which the engine contract would be awarded through competition. The F110 currently powers 86% of the USAF F-16C/Ds (June 2005). While the F110-GE-100 can provide around  more thrust than the F100-PW-200, it requires more airflow for the jet to fully exploit the engine; this led to the increase in the area of the engine inlet. The F-16C/D Block 30/32s were the first to be built with a common engine bay, able to accept both engines, with Block 30s having the bigger inlet (known as "Big Mouth") for the F110 and Block 32s retaining the standard inlet for the F100.

The F-16C/D Block 30 and 40 were powered by the  F110-GE-100, while the Block 50 was powered by the  F110-GE-129 IPE. The United Arab Emirates' F-16E/F Block 60 is powered by the  F110-GE-132, as was the proposed Lockheed Martin-Tata F-21, based on the Block 60 and initially designated F-16IN, for the Indian Air Force MMRCA competition.

Two derivatives of the F-16, the Mitsubishi F-2 and the General Dynamics F-16XL, are powered by the -129 IPE. The engines for the F-2 were license-built by IHI Corporation and designated F110-IHI-129.

F-15

Although the Air Force chose the Pratt & Whitney F100-PW-229 as the IPE for the F-15E Strike Eagle, a pair of F110-GE-129s were mounted on one aircraft for flight testing. South Korea would choose the -129 to power 40 F-15K fighters, the first time production F-15s were powered by a General Electric engine. The engines were manufactured through a joint licensing agreement with Samsung Techwin Company. It has also been chosen by the Republic of Singapore Air Force (RSAF) to power its F-15SG.

The F-15E would be further developed into the Advanced Eagle with a new fly-by-wire control system that incorporates the F110-GE-129's FADEC. The Advanced Eagle would be the basis for Saudi Arabia's F-15SA, Qatar's F-15QA, and the U.S. Air Force F-15EX.

Variants
F110-GE-100: Initial variant resulting from the F101 DFE (Derivative Fighter Engine), powers the F-16 Block 30 and 40.
F110-GE-400: Naval variant of the -100 with a 50” afterburner extension to fit the F-14, powers the F-14A+ (later designated F-14B) and F-14D.
F110-GE-129: Improved performance engine variant, powers the F-16 Block 50 and the F-15SG, SA, QA, and EX.
F110-GE-132: Further enhanced thrust variant powering the F-16 Block 60.

Applications
 General Dynamics F-16 Fighting Falcon
 General Dynamics F-16XL
 Grumman F-14A+ (F-14B) / F-14B Upgrade and F-14D Super Tomcat
 McDonnell Douglas F-15K/F-15S/F-15SA/F-15SG/F-15EX Korea/Saudi/Singapore Advanced Eagle/Eagle II
 Mitsubishi F-2
 TAI TFX

Specifications

F110-GE-129

F110-GE-132

See also

References

External links

 GE Aviation F110 page
 Aircraft Engine Historical Society - F110-GE-100 Gallery
 Global Security - F110

Low-bypass turbofan engines
F110
1980s turbofan engines